Chrysochroa edwardsii is a Jewel Beetle or Metallic Wood-boring Beetle of the Buprestidae family.

Description
Elytra are metallic green, with a large and rounded yellow-orange transversal band. Pronotum is dark purple and the legs are bright green.

Distribution
These beetles can be found in India and Thailand.

References
Proceedings of the Linnean Society of London, (14), Mar. 1842: 128. in Smithsonian Libraries
Universal Biological Indexer
Biolib
Zipcodezoo Species Identifier
Organism Names

Buprestidae
Beetles described in 1843